Sun Qingye, also known as Sun Wenqing (born 1965), is the deputy head of the Office for Safeguarding National Security of the CPG in the HKSAR. Sun has a background working in the Ministry of State Security of the People's Republic of China.

On 15 January 2021, pursuant to Executive Order 13936, the US Department of the Treasury imposed sanctions on 6 government officials, including Sun, in response to the arrest of more than 50 pro-democracy politicians and activists in Hong Kong.

After Sun was sanctioned, Apple Daily reported that Sun had been using an alias when he was sent to Hong Kong, and originally went by Sun Wenqing while working in other positions in the government.

References 

1965 births
Living people
Government ministers of Hong Kong
Chinese government officials
Security organizations
Individuals sanctioned by the United States under the Hong Kong Autonomy Act

Chinese individuals subject to U.S. Department of the Treasury sanctions